In mathematics, specifically in order theory and functional analysis, a sequence of positive elements  in a preordered vector space  (that is,  for all ) is called order summable if  exists in . 

The notion of order summable sequences is related to the completeness of the order topology.

See also

References

Bibliography

  
  

Functional analysis